Haroué is a commune in the Meurthe-et-Moselle department in north-eastern France.

Geography
The river Madon flows through the commune.

Historical Features
The Château d'Haroué was constructed between 1720 and 1732 by Germain Boffrand for Prince Marc de Beauvau, Viceroy of Tuscany. The architect had to integrate into his plans the four towers and the moat of the predating medieval castle of François de Bassompierre.  The decoration of the castle was entrusted to artists from the Lorraine region: Jean Lamour (1698-1771) for the gates, the balcony, and the banister, Pillement (1698-1771) for the interior painting of one of the towers, and Barthélemy Guibal (1699-1757), the sculptor of the fountains of Place Stanislas in Nancy, for the statuary. The French park was designed by Emilio Terry.

See also
 Communes of the Meurthe-et-Moselle department

References

Communes of Meurthe-et-Moselle